Gintarė Petronytė (born 19 March 1989) is a Lithuanian professional female basketball player, currently playing for Reyer Venezia in Italy.

Career
On 21 July 2010, Galatasaray Medical Park announced that Petronyte had joined the team on a two-year contract.

Honours
FIBA Europe Young Women's Player of the Year Award: (2008)
EuroCup Women
Winner: 2009–10, 2017–18
Lebanese Basketball League Champion (2017)

References

External links
Profile at Eurobasket.com
Profile at EuroBasket Women 2009

1989 births
Living people
Lithuanian women's basketball players
Centers (basketball)
Galatasaray S.K. (women's basketball) players
Sportspeople from Panevėžys
Antakya Belediyespor players
Lithuanian expatriate basketball people in Turkey